Donovan Léon (born 3 November 1992) is a French professional footballer who plays as a goalkeeper for  club Auxerre.

Career
León made his professional debut with Auxerre on 6 August 2011 in a 3–1 league defeat to Montpellier.

In June 2020, Léon returned to Auxerre after five years with Brest, signing a three-year contract. He joined on a free transfer after his contract with Brest had expired.

Career statistics

Club

Honours
French Guiana
Caribbean Cup bronze: 2017

References

External links
 
 
 

Living people
1992 births
Sportspeople from Cayenne
Association football goalkeepers
French Guianan footballers
French footballers
French people of French Guianan descent
Black French sportspeople
CSC de Cayenne players
AJ Auxerre players
Stade Brestois 29 players
Ligue 1 players
Ligue 2 players
Championnat National 2 players
Championnat National 3 players
French Guiana international footballers
2014 Caribbean Cup players
2017 CONCACAF Gold Cup players